In computational complexity theory, the space hierarchy theorems are separation results that show that both deterministic and nondeterministic machines can solve more problems in (asymptotically) more space, subject to certain conditions. For example, a deterministic Turing machine can solve more decision problems in space n log n than in space n. The somewhat weaker analogous theorems for time are the time hierarchy theorems.

The foundation for the hierarchy theorems lies in the intuition that
with either more time or more space comes the ability to compute more
functions (or decide more languages).  The hierarchy theorems are used
to demonstrate that the time and space complexity classes form a
hierarchy where classes with tighter bounds contain fewer languages
than those with more relaxed bounds.  Here we define and prove the
space hierarchy theorem.

The space hierarchy theorems rely on the concept of space-constructible functions. The deterministic and nondeterministic space hierarchy theorems state that for all space-constructible functions f(n),

,
where SPACE stands for either DSPACE or NSPACE, and  refers to the little o notation.

Statement 

Formally, a function  is space-constructible if  and there exists a Turing machine
which computes the function  in space  when starting
with an input , where  represents a string of n consecutive 1s. Most of the common functions that we work with are space-constructible, including polynomials, exponents, and logarithms.

For every space-constructible function , there exists a language  that is decidable in space
 but not in space .

Proof 

The goal is to define a language that can be decided in space  but not space .  The language is defined as :

The algorithm for deciding the language  is as follows:

 On an input , compute  using space-constructibility, and mark off  cells of tape. Whenever an attempt is made to use more than  cells, reject.
 If  is not of the form  for some TM , reject.
 Simulate  on input  for at most  steps (using  space).  If the simulation tries to use more than  space or more than  operations, then reject.
 If  accepted  during this simulation, then reject; otherwise, accept.

Note on step 3: Execution is limited to  steps in order to avoid the case where  does not halt on the input .  That is, the case where  consumes space of only  as required, but runs for infinite time.

The above proof holds for the case of PSPACE, but some changes need to be made for the case of NPSPACE. The crucial point is that while on a deterministic TM, acceptance and rejection can be inverted (crucial for step 4), this is not possible on a non-deterministic machine.

For the case of NPSPACE,  needs to be redefined first:

Now, the algorithm needs to be changed to accept  by modifying step 4 to:
 If  accepted  during this simulation, then accept; otherwise, reject.

 can not be decided by a TM using  cells. Assuming  can be decided by some TM  using  cells, and following from the Immerman–Szelepcsényi theorem,  can also be determined by a TM (called ) using  cells. Here lies the contradiction, therefore the assumption must be false:

Comparison and improvements 

The space hierarchy theorem is stronger than the analogous time hierarchy theorems in several ways:
 It only requires s(n) to be at least log n instead of at least n.
 It can separate classes with any asymptotic difference, whereas the time hierarchy theorem requires them to be separated by a logarithmic factor.
 It only requires the function to be space-constructible, not time-constructible.

It seems to be easier to separate classes in space than in time. Indeed, whereas the time hierarchy theorem has seen little remarkable improvement since its inception, the nondeterministic space hierarchy theorem has seen at least one important improvement by Viliam Geffert in his 2003 paper "Space hierarchy theorem revised". This paper made several generalizations of the theorem:

 It relaxes the space-constructibility requirement. These functions need not be space-constructible or even monotone increasing.
 It identifies a unary language, or tally language, which is in one class but not the other. In the original theorem, the separating language was arbitrary.
 It does not require  to be at least log n; it can be any nondeterministically fully space-constructible function.

Refinement of space hierarchy 

If space is measured as the number of cells used regardless of alphabet size, then  because one can achieve any linear compression by switching to a larger alphabet.  However, by measuring space in bits, a much sharper separation is achievable for deterministic space.  Instead of being defined up to a multiplicative constant, space is now defined up to an additive constant.  However, because any constant amount of external space can be saved by storing the contents into the internal state, we still have .

Assume that f is space-constructible.  SPACE is deterministic.
 For a wide variety of sequential computational models, including for Turing machines, SPACE(f(n)-ω(log(f(n)+n))) ⊊ SPACE(f(n)).  This holds even if SPACE(f(n)-ω(log(f(n)+n))) is defined using a different computational model than  because the different models can simulate each other with  space overhead. 
 For certain computational models, we even have SPACE(f(n)-ω(1)) ⊊ SPACE(f(n)).  In particular, this holds for Turing machines if we fix the alphabet, the number of heads on the input tape, the number of heads on the worktape (using a single worktape), and add delimiters for the visited portion of the worktape (that can be checked without increasing space usage).  SPACE(f(n)) does not depend on whether the worktape is infinite or semi-infinite.  We can also have a fixed number of worktapes if f(n) is either a SPACE constructible tuple giving the per-tape space usage, or a SPACE(f(n)-ω(log(f(n)))-constructible number giving the total space usage (not counting the overhead for storing the length of each tape).

The proof is similar to the proof of the space hierarchy theorem, but with two complications: The universal Turing machine has to be space-efficient, and the reversal has to be space-efficient. One can generally construct universal Turing machines with  space overhead, and under appropriate assumptions, just  space overhead (which may depend on the machine being simulated). For the reversal, the key issue is how to detect if the simulated machine rejects by entering an infinite (space-constrained) loop. At the cost of a potentially exponential time increase, loops can be detected space-efficiently as follows:

Modify the machine to erase everything and go to a specific configuration A on success. Use depth-first search to determine whether A is reachable in the space bound from the starting configuration. The search starts at A and goes over configurations that lead to A. Because of determinism, this can be done in place and without going into a loop.

It can also be determined whether the machine exceeds a space bound (as opposed to looping within the space bound) by iterating over all configurations about to exceed the space bound and checking (again using depth-first search) whether the initial configuration leads to any of them.

Corollaries

Corollary 1 

This corollary lets us separate various space complexity classes.
For any function  is space-constructible for any natural
number k. Therefore for any two natural numbers  we can
prove . This idea can be extended for real numbers in the following corollary. This demonstrates the detailed hierarchy within the PSPACE class.

 Corollary 2 For any two nonnegative real numbers . Corollary 3 

NL ⊊ PSPACE.

 Proof 

Savitch's theorem shows that , while the space hierarchy theorem shows that . The result is this corollary along with the fact that TQBF ∉ NL
since TQBF is PSPACE-complete.

This could also be proven using the non-deterministic space hierarchy theorem to show that NL ⊊ NPSPACE, and using Savitch's theorem to show that PSPACE = NPSPACE.

 Corollary 4 

PSPACE ⊊ EXPSPACE.

This last corollary shows the existence of decidable problems that are intractable. In other words, their decision procedures must use more than polynomial space.

 Corollary 5 

There are problems in  requiring an arbitrarily large exponent to solve; therefore  does not collapse to (nk) for some constant k.

 See also 
 Time hierarchy theorem

 References 

 Luca Trevisan. Notes on Hierarchy Theorems. Handout 7. CS172: Automata, Computability and Complexity. U.C. Berkeley. April 26, 2004.
 Viliam Geffert. Space hierarchy theorem revised. Theoretical Computer Science'', volume 295, number 1–3, p. 171-187. February 24, 2003.
  Pages 306–310 of section 9.1: Hierarchy theorems.
  Section 7.2: The Hierarchy Theorem, pp. 143–146.

Articles containing proofs
Structural complexity theory
Theorems in computational complexity theory